Draco beccarii is a species of lizard in the family Agamidae. The species is endemic to Indonesia.

Etymology
The specific name, beccarii, is in honor of Italian botanist Odoardo Beccari.

Geographic range
In Indonesia, D. beccarii is found on the following islands: Buton, Kabaena, Muna, and eastern Sulawesi.

Description

Reproduction
D. beccarii is oviparous.

References

Further reading
Boulenger GA (1885). Catalogue of the Lizards in the British Museum (Natural History). Second Edition. Volume I. ... Agamidæ. London: Trustees of the British Museum (Natural History). (Taylor and Francis, printers). xii + 436 pp. + Plates I–XXXII. (Draco beccarii, pp. 264–265).
McGuire JA, Brown RM, Mumpuni, Riyanto A, Andayani N (2007). "The flying lizards of the Draco lineatus group (Squamata: Iguania: Agamidae): A taxonomic revision with descriptions of two new species". Herpetological Monographs 21 (1): 180–213.
Peters W, Doria G (1878). "Catalogo dei rettili e batraci raccolti da O. Beccari, L. M. D'Albertis e A.A. Bruijn nella sotto-regione austro-malese ". Annali del Museo Civico di Storia Naturale di Genova 13: 323–450. (Draco beccarii, new species, pp. 373–374). (in Italian and Latin).

Draco (genus)
Reptiles of Indonesia
Reptiles described in 1878
Taxa named by Wilhelm Peters
Taxa named by Giacomo Doria